The Hollywood Studio Symphony (sometimes the Hollywood Freelance Studio Symphony) is the credited name of the symphony orchestra behind many major soundtracks, including  The Chronicles of Narnia: The Lion, the Witch and the Wardrobe, Sucker Punch, Jurassic Park 3, Last Samurai, Pirates of the Caribbean, We Are Marshall, Spider-Man 2,  Lost and The Bourne Supremacy.  Although the name "Hollywood Studio Symphony" may lead listeners to think that it is a conventional symphony orchestra like the London Symphony Orchestra, the actual members of the ensemble are session musicians residing in Los Angeles contracted individually and differ from soundtrack to soundtrack.

Background 
Often in soundtracks, the individual members of the orchestra that performs the actual score are not credited (with some exceptions being the "orchestra leader" or concertmaster). Usually, only the "orchestra contractor" is credited.

The use of the "Hollywood Studio Symphony" name is part of a 2001 contract negotiated between the American Federation of Musicians and the Alliance of Motion Picture and Television Producers to provide an incentive for soundtracks to be recorded with Los Angeles musicians instead of foreign musicians and recording venues (often in London and Prague) who were cheaper.  In the new contract, the AFM musicians agreed to lower their record rates in exchange for individual credits to all the musicians that perform the score as well as recognition for the local community venture.  Thus, the "Hollywood Studio Symphony" name is given to the entire ensemble in addition to the individual musician credits as a way to brand the LA effort.

Filmography

Film

Television

External links 
 Hollywood Studio Symphony home page
 Variety.com article that discusses the "Hollywood Studio Symphony" name  

American instrumental musical groups
American session musicians
Video game musicians
Symphony orchestras
American orchestras
Capitol Records artists
DreamWorks Records artists
Sony Classical Records artists
Varèse Sarabande Records artists
Walt Disney Records artists
Columbia Records artists
Shangri-La Records artists
Warner Music Group artists
Landmark Records artists
MGM Records artists
Virgin Records artists
Universal Records artists
United Artists Records artists
Four Star Records artists
Interscope Records artists